The Herbalists Act 1542 (34 & 35 Hen 8 c 8) was an Act of the Parliament of England.

This Act was repealed by section 1 of, and Schedule 1 to, the Statute Law Revision Act 1958.

References
Halsbury's Statutes,

Acts of the Parliament of England (1485–1603)
1542 in law
1542 in England